Sainte-Hélène is a commune in the Vosges department in Grand Est in northeastern France.

Geography 
The village lies in the middle of the commune, on the right bank of the Arentèle, a tributary of the Mortagne, which forms most of the commune's eastern border.

See also 
 Communes of the Vosges department

References 

Communes of Vosges (department)